"2 Faced" is a song by English singer Louise, released on 17 July 2000 as the lead single from her third studio album, Elbow Beach (2000). It is her highest-charting single, reaching number three on the UK Singles Chart and number 13 on the Irish Singles Chart in July 2000. It has sold 153,000 copies in the UK according to the Official Charts Company.

Track listings

UK CD1
 "2 Faced"
 "Say Yes"
 "Lost"
 "2 Faced" (video)

UK CD2
 "2 Faced"
 "2 Faced" (Agnelli & Nelson vocal mix)
 "2 Faced" (Perfect Phase vocal)

UK cassette single
 "2 Faced"
 "Say Yes"
 "Lost"

European CD single
 "2 Faced"
 "2 Faced" (Perfect Phase vocal)

Personnel
Personnel are taken from the UK CD1 liner notes.
 Louise – writing
 Matt Elliss – writing, keyboard, programming, production, mixing, engineering
 Julie Morrison – writing, backing vocals
 Cathi Ogden – backing vocals
 M4 Design – sleeve design
 Tim Bret Day – photography

Charts

Weekly charts

Year-end charts

Sales

|}

References

2000 singles
2000 songs
EMI Records singles
First Avenue Records singles
Louise Redknapp songs
Songs written by Louise Redknapp